Chasia is a former municipality in Grevena regional unit, West Macedonia, Greece. It takes its name from the Chasia mountains. Since the 2011 local government reform it is part of the municipality Deskati, of which it is a municipal unit. Population 1,558 (2011). The seat of the municipality was in Karpero. The municipal unit has an area of 162.692 km2.

References

Populated places in Grevena (regional unit)
Former municipalities in Western Macedonia

bg:Хасия (дем в Ном Гревена)